Siyeh Glacier is in Glacier National Park in the U.S. state of Montana. Siyeh Glacier has experienced massive retreat, losing over 73 percent of its surface area between 1966 and 2005.

References

See also
 List of glaciers in the United States
 Glaciers in Glacier National Park (U.S.)

Glaciers of Glacier County, Montana
Glaciers of Glacier National Park (U.S.)
Glaciers of Montana